The Gender and Trade Initiative (GATI) is an initiative of the Society for Conflict Analysis and Resolution (SOFCAR) a New Delhi-based research and advocacy organisation.

Introduction

GATI was launched in November 2004 with the support and guidance of UNIFEM South Asia Regional Office (UNIFEM-SARO) to focus on critical issues relating to Gender and Trade in South Asia and beyond. It originated with the realization that gender and trade issues have not been accorded their due importance by researchers and advocacy groups alike. Often, trade policies have been characterized as gender neutral. However, increasingly there is a growing recognition of the fact that the processes of globalization are associated with rapid changes in forms of work and life and have clear differential impacts on gender relations and outcomes.

The General Agreement on Trade in Services (GATS) was established with the same objectives as the General Agreement on Tariffs and Trade (GATT) in the domain of merchandise trade. These objectives include establishing a dependable and trustworthy system of international trade rules, ensuring equitable and just treatment of all participants (in accordance with the principle of non-discrimination), encouraging economic activity through binding policy commitments, and promoting trade and development through gradual liberalization.

Currently, services contribute to more than two-thirds of global production and employment, but they account for only 25 percent of overall trade when measured through balance-of-payments statistics. Although this may seem like a small share, it is not to be underestimated. This is because the balance-of-payments statistics fail to capture one of the modes of service supply defined in the GATS, which is the provision of services through commercial presence in a foreign country (mode 3). Moreover, despite the fact that services are increasingly traded independently, they also serve as critical inputs in the production of goods. As a result, when evaluated in terms of value-added, services account for about 50 percent of world trade.

Objective

The core objective of GATI has been to conduct credible evidence based research on the subject, provide policy inputs and promote a wider awareness and debate on the theme. Essentially, since the terms of the debate have been couched in technical jargons and the same needs to be demystified and communicated in a simple format to non-specialist audience.

GATI is a partner of UNIFEM-SARO and the Commonwealth Secretariat. It maintains active links with trade and gender experts in academic institutions and in civil society across South Asia, Africa and other Commonwealth nations.

Key programme areas

Currently GATI maintains a web-based resource centre on gender and trade related issues in partnership with the Commonwealth Secreatriat. The website was launched at the 8th Commonwealth Women's Affairs Ministers Meeting (8WAMM) held in Uganda, 11–14 June 2007 with an idea to provide a platform interlinking research, advocacy and action across the Commonwealth countries with the objective of facilitating and promoting gender sensitive trade policies at the national, regional and multilateral levels.

 Conduct evidence based research on trade and gender linkages. 
 Advocate for gender mainstreaming in trade negotiations through capacity building workshops, seminars and consultations.
 Build the capacity of government and civil society on trade and gender issues.
 Develop networks and convergence with regional and international organisations on issues of gender and trade.

Partner organisations

Centre for Legislative Research and Advocacy is an independent, not-for-profit, non-partisan initiative, which works to support and strengthen Parliament and legislatures so as to realise the values of democratic governance.

References

External links
 Official GATI website
 Gender and Trade Website

Non-profit organisations based in India